Benjamin Gimbert  (6 February 1903 – 6 May 1976), an engine driver with the London and North Eastern Railway (LNER), was awarded the George Cross and the Order of Industrial Heroism, as was his fireman James Nightall, whose award was posthumous, for saving an ammunition train from a fire on 2 June 1944 during the Soham rail disaster.

Early life
Gimbert was born on 6 February 1903 in Ely (now in Cambridgeshire), the son of farm labourer George William Gimbert and his wife Florence. He married in 1926 and by 1939 was living in March.

George Cross

The citation for the awards read:

Other awards
Gimbert was also awarded the Order of Industrial Heroism, a private civil award given by the Daily Herald newspaper, and the LNER's silver medal for Courage and Resource. In 1953 he received the Queen Elizabeth II Coronation Medal.

Memorials

Gimbert died on 6 May 1976 and was buried in Eastwood Cemetery in March. In 1984, his medals were bought by March Town Council and are on permanent loan to March Museum alongside some shrapnel removed from his body.

On 28 September 1981 two Class 47 locomotives were named in honour of the two railwaymen: No. 47577 was named "Benjamin Gimbert, GC" and No. 47579 "James Nightall, GC".
The nameplate "Benjamin Gimbert GC" was transferred to 47 574 in July 1987 at Stratford depot. It remained on this locomotive for 10 years. 
On 2 June 2004 new "Benjamin Gimbert GC" nameplates were applied to Class 66 077 at Whitemoor yard (March). Also the Norfolk Green bus company have named Optare Solo 617 (MX55WCV) after Gimbert.

References

External links
 2 June 1944 Soham Rail Disaster

See also
John Axon
Lists of rail accidents

1903 births
1976 deaths
British train drivers
British recipients of the George Cross
People from Ely, Cambridgeshire
People from March, Cambridgeshire
Recipients of the Order of Industrial Heroism
London and North Eastern Railway people